The Margaret A. Edwards Award is an American Library Association (ALA) literary award that annually recognizes an author and "a specific body of his or her work, for significant and lasting contribution to young adult literature". It is named after Margaret A. Edwards (1902–1988), the pioneer, longtime director of young adult services at Enoch Pratt Free Library in Baltimore.

The award was inaugurated in 1988 as the biennial "School Library Journal Young Adult Author Award/Selected and Administered by the American Library Association's Young Adult Services Division". After 1990 it was renamed and made annual. It continues to be sponsored by School Library Journal and administered by the Young Adult Library Services Association, descendant of YASD. The winner is announced during the ALA midwinter meeting and the citation and $2000 cash prize are presented at a luncheon during the ALA annual conference (June 27–July 2 in 2013).

History and criteria

The "young adult" class of books developed in library collections and publisher promotions, and young adult literature became a "respected field of study", in the second half of the twentieth century. When School Library Journal initiated the award for YA writers, the ALA awards program recognized the YA class only by annual lists of recommended books, the Best Books for Young Adults and a list "for the reluctant YA reader". (Indeed, the Printz Award for the year's best book was established only in 1999.) Chief editor Lillian N. Gerhardt determined that SLJ should merely sponsor the award and recruited the ALA Young Adult Services Division to administer it.

The official name of the award approved in 1986 was unusually long even with initialisms, "The SLJ Young Adult Author Award/Selected and Administered by the ALA's YASD". In the 1988 and 1990 award citations as presented online decades later, it is called the "Young Adult Services Division/School Library Journal Author Achievement Award". During the third cycle it was made annual and renamed for the recently deceased Edwards.

As of the fourth cycle, 1991/1992, the committee was charged to select "a living author or co-author whose book or books, over a period of time, have been accepted by young people as an authentic voice that continues to illuminate their experiences and emotions, giving insight into their lives." Among other specific criteria, the body of work should have "acceptable literary quality" and be "currently popular with a wide range of young adults in the many different parts of the country". Furthermore, the winner must "agree to personally accept the award at the following Annual Conference", about five months after the selection.

SLJ editor Gerhardt covered the award at least once, in an editorial at the time of inaugural presentation to S. E. Hinton (June 1988). For some time beginning 1990, the June issue of SLJ covered the current award and carried an interview with the preceding winner.

Winners

The award has been conferred 34 times in the 35 years through 2022. The honored writers have been natives and lifelong residents of the United States except Anne McCaffrey, Terry Pratchett, Susan Cooper, and Markus Zusak.

Multiple awards

No one has won both the Edwards Award and the Laura Ingalls Wilder Medal, which the ALA children's division (ALSC) awards for "substantial and lasting contributions to children's literature" (from 1954, now biennial). 

Four Edwards winners have been selected by ALSC to deliver its annual May Hill Arbuthnot Lecture: Susan Cooper in 2001, Ursula K. Le Guin in 2004, Walter Dean Myers in 2009, and Lois Lowry in 2011. ALSC considers the Arbuthnot selection, inaugurated in 1970, another career award for contribution to children's literature. The lecturer prepares and delivers —currently about 16 months after selection— "a paper considered to be a significant contribution to the field of children's literature", which is also published in the ALSC journal.

See also
 
 Michael L. Printz Award, ALA book award for young-adult literature 
 Laura Ingalls Wilder Award, ALA lifetime award for children's literature 
 List of ALA awards

Notes

References

 
Awards established in 1988
American children's literary awards
American Library Association awards
Young adult literature awards
English-language literary awards